Soulaïman Allouch (born 26 January 2002) is a Dutch professional footballer who plays as a forward for Eerste Divisie club VVV-Venlo.

Career
Having signed for AZ Alkmaar in 2019, Allouch made his senior debut with Jong AZ. In January 2023, he signed for VVV-Venlo on a three-and-a-half year contract.

Personal life
Born in the Netherlands, Allouch is of Moroccan descent.

Career statistics

Honours
Netherlands U17
UEFA European Under-17 Championship: 2019

References

2002 births
Living people
Dutch footballers
Netherlands youth international footballers
Association football forwards
Amsterdamsche FC players
AFC Ajax players
AZ Alkmaar players
Jong AZ players
VVV-Venlo players
Eerste Divisie players
Dutch sportspeople of Moroccan descent
21st-century Dutch people